Ali Maisam Nazary (Persian: علی میثم نظری, born 1990) is an Afghan politician; since August 2021 he is head of Foreign Relations for the National Resistance Front of Afghanistan (NRF).

Education 
Ali Nazary is an alumnus of the University of California, Los Angeles and the London School of Economics. He graduated from UCLA in 2012 with a degree in International Relations and Comparative Politics, and with a master's from LSE, focused on nationalism, governance, nation- and state-building, and conflict studies.

Career 
Ali Nazary began his career in communications at Khorasan TV, hosting a weekly show on politics and current affairs in Afghanistan. He then was Director of Media Affairs for Abdullah Abdullah's 2014 presidential campaign, and following the election, Nazary took a hiatus from politics to work as an Afghan and Central Asian government relations specialist at Bellwether Partners, overseeing international relations consulting and management projects. In 2016, he also became president of the Massoud Foundation USA, the U.S. branch of the Massoud family's Afghan relief organization, a position he continues to hold.

National Resistance Front 
As tensions between the Taliban and the government grew amidst the drawdown of NATO forces from Afghanistan, Nazary returned to politics as responsible for the foreign relations of the resistance in America for National Resistance Front of Afghanistan office. With the fall of Kabul and Ashraf Ghani's flight from the country, Massoud allied with Vice President Amrullah Saleh (who had assumed the role of Acting President) to form the National Resistance Front, based in Panjshir.

Nazary was appointed Head of Foreign Relations for the NRF.

References 

Afghan politicians
21st-century Afghan politicians
University of California, Los Angeles alumni
Alumni of the London School of Economics
1990 births
Living people